Tshila (born June 10, 1983) is a Ugandan singer-songwriter, musician, and record producer.

Background
Tshila was born in Kampala, Uganda. She wasn't raised in a musical family and didn't study music at any of the schools she attended as a young student in Uganda. She completed her degree in software engineering in the United States of America, then returned to Uganda, where she began to develop her musical talent.

Musical career
Back in Uganda, she began making music as part of the groundbreaking hip-hop group Bataka Squad. Inspired by the influence she could have through music, she taught herself to play guitar and started to experiment with her own sound. She recorded and self-produced her first album, Sipping From the Nile, in 2006. The album gained recognition from music critics around the world. In 2007, the BBC World Service conducted a talent search and named her one of the 20 best unsigned artists in the world.

Tshila performed at international music festivals in Zanzibar and Senegal, and toured Europe, sponsored by the Austrian Ministry of Culture. Her musical blend of acoustic soul with hip-hop, traditional African music, jazz and spoken word poetry introduced audiences to her unique style of artistry. She collaborated with Johnny Strange of Culcha Candela and Stereotype from Vienna, Austria. She became an ambassador of the Afrika Rise Foundation and the Bavubuka Foundation, which offer underprivileged youth a way out of poverty through music and the arts.

In 2017, she performed at the Kennedy Center Millennium Stage in Washington, DC.

Tshila returned to the studio in 2018 to record and produce World in Crisis. The album is a musical message for the world that chronicles humanity's shared challenges and offers universal solutions. She addresses the social and political challenges the world faces, especially from an African woman's perspective. She cares deeply about the issues that affect Africans and people of color worldwide.

Tshila's mission is to create inspirational music as a force for positive change in the world.

Discography 

 2007: Sipping From The Nile
 Tracks:
01 Intro
02 Namboozo
03 Ca Suffit
04 Interlude
05 Nkole Sente
06 Omubbi Waakuno
07 Sipping From the Nile
08 Scientific Love
09 Beera Nange
10 Interlude
11 Buli Shesi Nghola
12 Outro
 2018: World in Crisis
 Tracks::
01 Intro – Never Exisisted
02 World in Crisis
03 Interlude – Keep Calm and Sell Out
04 The Way It Is
05 Revolution Now
06 Not Alone
07 Khube Atwela
08 City of Lights
09 A Girl Has No Name
10 Medicine
11 Dear God
12 Water

Press 
BBC World Service "Ugandan rapper has plans to deal with a world in crisis" [March 14, 2019]
PRI's The World "This Ugandan rapper was ‘miseducated,’ Lauryn Hill-style" [March 12, 2019]
WDIY 88.1 FM "Ugandan-Born Singer-Songwriter Tshila on The Blend" [March 6, 2019]
Nile Post "Tshila’s World in Crisis Out" [December 3, 2018]
BBC News "Africa Beats: Tshila" [April 5, 2012]

References

External links 
 Official Website

Ugandan singer-songwriters
1983 births
Living people
Spoken word artists